Jan Kozák (5 July 1929 – 3 October 2016) was a Czech basketball player. He was voted to the Czechoslovakian 20th Century Team in 2001.

National team career
Withe the senior Czechoslovakian national team, Kozák competed in the men's tournament at the 1948 Summer Olympics, and the 1952 Summer Olympics. With Czechoslovakia, he also won silver medals at the 1947 EuroBasket, the 1951 EuroBasket, and the 1955 EuroBasket.

References

External links
FIBA Profile

1929 births
2016 deaths
Czech men's basketball players
Olympic basketball players of Czechoslovakia
Basketball players at the 1948 Summer Olympics
Basketball players at the 1952 Summer Olympics
Sportspeople from Brno